Cochylimorpha kenneli is a species of moth of the family Tortricidae. It is found in Uzbekistan.

References

Moths described in 1967
Cochylimorpha
Taxa named by Józef Razowski
Moths of Asia